Avalancha de Éxitos (in Spanish: Avalanche of Hits) is Café Tacuba's third album. In 1996, two years after their acclaimed Re, the band had amassed enough new music to fill four CDs, but couldn't winnow it down to a single album. So instead, they covered eight songs by other Spanish-speaking artists, who ranged from totally obscure to well-known.

Background 
After the publication of Re, the band was between the releasing of the album and the subsequent tours as well as the fulfillment of the contract with Warne also continue in the scene while have proper time preparing their formal third LP. After their performance at Viña del Mar Festival in 1996, producer Gustavo Santaolalla proposed them a "transition album" made with covers, an idea that the group accepted. Since its formation the group used to perform versions of other bands that they liked.

Recording 
The concept of the album allowed Café Tacvba to focus on the creativity of the music, so they agreed to start the rehearsals by each member of the band bringing ideas of what songs would be included on the album. The group chose several songs related to the rock of Mexico of the 80s:

The first round of songs chosen for the album included "Chilanga Banda" (Jaime López), "Estás Perdida" (Ritmo Peligroso), "Planet Earth" (Duran Duran) and "Una Mañana" (originally "Morning" by Clare Fischer, popularized with lyrics in Spanish as "Una Mañana" by José José), the same that the group had already performed for their 1995 MTV Unplugged and which would be published in Un Tributo (a José José) in 1998. Of the latter, Clare Fischer told to Warner production that he hated José José version and he agreed with the recording but with another lyrics so the band then refused to include the song, "we said that for us Clare Fischer did not mean anything, but José José yes", said about Joselo Rangel. Just Jaime López's "Chilanga Banda" remained, a song that the band met by Octavio Hernández, a journalist and cultural promoter from Tijuana.

"Metamorfosis" is a song by the Mexican band Axis, which performed at the concert venues in Ciudad Satélite area where the early band attended and which won the First Youth Rock Festival organized by Peerless label in 1985. Juan Luis Guerra's "Ojalá Que Llueva Café" was chosen by the band as it was a song they liked from the time they were students and was remade at the initiative of Meme as a son huasteco, given the previous work that was done by the band with maestro huapanguero Alejandro Flores in "Las flores" for the band's MTV Unplugged. "No me comprendes" by Bola de Nieve was Quique's suggestion, while the band unanimously decided «Alármala de tos» by Botellita de Jerez and "No controles", one of the hits in Mexico by Flans in the 80s —version to Spanish band Olé Olé— and that the group chose to listen to at the parties they attended. "Perfidia" published in 1939 by Alberto Domínguez was chosen from the beginning as an instrumental track in tribute to the instrumental music of the 60s such as Santo & Johnny and The Ventures. "Cómo te extraño", a 1964 song by Leo Dan was included at the suggestion by Warner executives. The title of Avalancha de éxitos is a word game that by one side pay homage to 60s and 50s names of compilation albums that only included hits of some musical groups and by the other refers to Avalancha a popular soap-box cart that is depicted on the front of the album artwork.

Among the rhythms included in the album are ska, bolero, heavy metal, post-rock, hip-hop, punk and son huasteco.

Recording 
Unlike their previous album Avalancha de éxitos was recorded in Mexico, at the band's first rehearsal venue in Naucalpan. The band used a console with equalizers provided by Gustavo Santaolalla with two microphones using an ADAT portable recorder. David Byrne participated in "No Controles". Some incidental noises caused by recording in a rehearsal room were left in the final product.

Promotion 
Avalancha de Éxitos was the band's first album to reach a high place on the US Billboard chart, peaking number 12. In Mexico, like the previous album Re, it would have a moderate reception. Outside of Mexico the album opened the doors to the Spanish-speaking market, taking them in addition to the United States and Chile, where they had already performed, on a two-and-a-half-month tour of countries in which they had not performed, including all of Central America, South America and Caribbean countries like Cuba and the Dominican Republic.

The promotional video for the album was that of "Chilanga banda" which was directed by Ángel Flores with art by Eugenio Caballero.

Track listing

Band members
 Anónimo (Rubén Albarrán): vocals, guitar
 Emmanuel del Real: keyboards, acoustic guitar, piano, programming, vocals, melodion
 Joselo Rangel: electric guitar, acoustic guitar, vocals
 Quique Rangel: bass guitar, electric upright bass, vocals

References

Café Tacuba albums
1996 albums